Papa Beaver's Storytime is an animated television series based on the Père Castor series of children's story books produced by French publisher's editor Paul Faucher. The series which was produced by Cinar, originally aired from 1993 to 1995 and 2002 on the French channels Canal J and France 3, and later on the American channel Nickelodeon's Nick Jr. block between 1994 and 1997.

Synopsis
Series presenting a collection of tales based on the Père Castor series of French children's stories. Papa Beaver's Storytime is an animated television series which tells of Papa Beaver, a caretaker, a father figure, but most importantly, a storyteller. The show starts out with some type of disagreement between the children, who then turn to Papa Beaver for a solution. He begins telling them some stories which are somehow related to the situation the children are in, the stories are either a fable or a fairytale ultimately telling the morality of the story to teach them a lesson about their actions they have done before the story began.

Episodes
Original titles:
 Gardon
 Les trois cheveux d'or
 Le grand cerf
 Chante pinson
 Horreur, peste, vinaigre
 Les vacances de Mariette
 L'extravagant désir de Cochon Rose
 Micha et Macha
 Jeannot Blanchet
 Merlin Merlot
 Tempête chez les lapins
 Duvet ne veut pas voler
 Pic et pic et colégram
 Poulet des bois
 Comment le chat trouva la maison de ses rêves
 Un chat heureux
 Le calife cigogne
 Les nains et le géant
 Le vilain petit canard
 L'envol du petit canard
 Le gâteau de Dialo
 Le grand tam-tam
 La vache Amélie
 Tout-en-soie
 Les animaux qui cherchaient l'été
 La bonne vieille
 Le chien de Brisquet
 Le violon enchanté
 Le cheveu de lune
 Fourmiguette
 Le chat botté
 Le tigre en bois
 Bernique
 La reine des poissons
 La grosse noix
 Les malheurs de César
 Émile
 Eustache et Raoul
 Tricoti tricota
 Charlotte et la mère Citrouille
 Les trois frères
 Le tapis volant
 Histoire de la lettre
 Nuit de mai
 La Grise et la poulette
 Un pantalon pour mon ânon
 L'histoire de Zo'hio
 Le singe et l'hirondelle
 Bravo tortue
 Histoire d'ours et d'élans
 Roule galette
 L'apprenti sorcier
 Les bons amis
 Michka
 Ne dérangez pas les dragons
 Les piquants de Goz
 La chèvre et les biquets
 Les trois petits cochons
 Marlaguette
 Boucle d'or et les trois ours
 Perlette, goutte d'eau
 Demoiselle Libellule
 La vache orange
 Le cheval bleu
 Le conte de La Marguerite
 Cigalou
 Le joueur de flûte de Hamelin
 Le roi qui ne pouvait pas éternuer
 Le mouchoir de Benjamin
 Blancheline
 Mon lit dans les étoiles
 Le coup de pied
 Le jamais content
 La plume du caneton
 Noix de coco cherche un ami
 Le beau chardon d'Ali Boron
 Tirbouchonnet a la rougeole
 Deux petits cochons trop cochons
 La boîte à soleil
 La chouette d'Emilie
 La plus mignonne des petites souris
 La famille Rataton
 Le petit cheval et le vieux chameau
 La grande panthère noire
 Le petit chacal très malin
 Oiseaux de pluie
 Du poison pour les dragons
 Bien fait pour eux
 Baba Yaga
 Les deux bossus
 Le petit zèbre
 Histoire de singe
 Pâquerette et poulette coquette
 Les noces de Clémentine
 Agnès a grandi
 Agnès et la mouette gracieuse
 Le chat de monsieur Neige
 La souris, le chat et le petit garçon...
 Poulerousse
 Le petit cochon trop gourmand
 Un tour de renard
 La pêche aux anguilles
 Le blaireau à lunettes
 Le blaireau et sa voisine
 Le monstre de Mr Stravinski
 Écho le géant
 Ma mère est une sorcière
 Le manteau du Père Noël
 Un cauchemar de grippe
 Berk le crapaud
 L'arbre à grands-pères
 Rentrée sur l'île Vanille
 Lisette
 J'aime trop les chapeaux
 Les musiciens de Brême
 Le pont du diable
 Le Noël de maître Belloni
 Kolos et les quatre voleurs
 Grosse peur pour bébé-loup
 Maxime Loupiot
 Feu follet est très pressé
 Colas vole
 La sorcière née du vinaigre
 Castagrogne de carabistouille
 Le chien qui n'avait pas de nom
 Aimé Bienvenu et ses amis
 Tante marraine
 Crottes alors
 Foming et le trésor des mers
 Quand le soleil deviendra rouge
 Mon meilleur ami est un chameau
 Izmir
 Le cartable magique
 Super Papa
 Les lettres de Biscotte Mulotte
 Une dent contre la souris
 Les animaux du zoo sont malades
 Le monstre que personne n'a vu
 Espèce de cucurbitacée
 Le petit carnet d'Archibald
 C'est mon nid
 La poule, le coq, le cochon
 Le virus de la rentrée
 La guerre des kilos
 Noël baobab
 Épaminondas
 Benjamin a une petite sœur
 Titou a peur de tout
 Le chant du hibou
 La montagne du souriceau
 Fleur des aurores
 Le cordonnier de Bagdad
 Lou la brebis
 La petite fille et les loups
 La boîte à trésors
 Princesse Mariotte

Cast
 Papa Beaver: Walter Massey
 Grandson: Teddy Lee Dillon
 Granddaughter: Pauline Little
 Additional voices: Bruce Dinsmore, Kathleen Fee, Rick Jones, Aimee Castle, Daniel Brochu, Maggie Castle, Michael Rudder, Thor Bishopric, Anik Matern, Sonja Ball, Vlasta Vrána, Bronwen Mantel, Mark Camacho, A.J. Henderson, Arthur Holden, Aron Tager, Susan Glover, Terrance Scammell

References

External links
 

1993 French television series debuts
2002 French television series endings
1993 Canadian television series debuts
2002 Canadian television series endings
1990s French animated television series
1990s Canadian animated television series
Canadian children's animated fantasy television series
Fictional beavers
French children's animated fantasy television series
Nick Jr. original programming
Television series by Cookie Jar Entertainment
Animated television series about mammals